Sierra de Cazorla may refer to:
Sierra de Cazorla, a mountain range of the Prebaetic system
Sierras de Cazorla, Segura y Las Villas Natural Park, a protected area in Spain
Sierra de Cazorla (comarca), a comarca in Jaén Province